The Portal is a Canadian sci-fi, fantasy, comedy short film directed and written by Jonathan Williams. The short film stars Tahmoh Penikett and Erin Karpluk. The short film has been adapted into an ongoing web series titled Riftworld Chronicles (see below), which has won numerous awards.

Plot
A dimension-traveling wizard gets stuck in 21st century Toronto because cell phone radiation interferes with his magic. With his home world on the brink of war, he seeks help from Kim, a travel agent who he mistakes for a great sorceress. Without his powers to prove his identity, she has trouble taking him seriously, but finally agrees to reveal the secrets of our world in exchange for a lunch date.

Cast
Tahmoh Penikett as Alar, a dimension-traveling wizard
Erin Karpluk as Kim, a travel agent (in the short film), or struggling journalist (in the Riftworld series)

Production
The Portal turned into a web series shot in the fall of 2014. On June 20, 2014 the Independent Production Fund announced that they would fund The Portal along with 16 other digital drama series.

Riftworld Chronicles 

The webseries that has been spun off the short is titled Riftworld Chronicles. As of July 2015, 8 episodes of circa 5–10 minutes each have been published, all of which were uploaded to the YouTube channel CBC Punchline owned by the Canadian Broadcasting Corporation (which is where the official website to both the short and the series links to for each new episode), on 13 July 2015. New episodes will be produced based upon number of clicks on YouTube and/or on the official website.

There are a few notable differences between the short film and the series, the latter of which does not simply take off from where the short film ends. Rather, both are different takes on the same premise. The short covers circa 10 minutes more or less in real time, at the end of which Kim decides to follow Alar to his homeworld for a timespan that in our world appears as just her lunchtime, but when she returns as a learned sorceress from Alar's world, she has obviously lived there for a number of years and has a child circa aged 10 to whom she shows her homeworld. In the series, however, as of episode 8, she has never left our world and, while some intimate tension has occurred between them, still thinks of Alar as a harmless lunatic.

Other major differences include the fact that in the short, Kim is a travel agent, while in the series she is a journalist, and that in the series, she now has a somewhat immature, pothead and gamer brother with whom she lives. Her brother immediately clicks with the visitor whom he assumes to just be a fantasy cosplayer who's "taking things a bit far", and (besides the obvious culture shock and misunderstandings between Alar and other people about modern life on earth and his Medieval fantasy attitude and understanding of things) a number of jokes revolve around the fact that many things in Alar's world work just like they do in certain video games or fantasy cosplay subcultures that Kim's brother knows about and they exchange anecdotes of each other's "quests" as if they've known each other's worlds for years. Rather than Kim visiting Alar's world as she does at the end of the short, an assassin of a non-human race who is after Alar has arrived in ours during the most recent episodes, but as of episode 8, no close encounters have occurred yet other than Alar having seen the assassin from a window, now knowing about the second, more dangerous visitor to our realm. The assassin has broken into Kim and her brother's home and stolen her late mother's talisman, which at the end of episode 8 is revealed to potentially hold powers that as-of-now had been unknown to Kim.

Release
On October 29, 2014 the short film was made available online at riftworldchronicles.com.

NOTE: As of this edit, the "official" website appears to have been repurposed as a blog about gamlbing/gaming sites written in Indonesian. Unfortunately, the Facebook page linked below is also completely missing.

Awards and nominations

References

External links
 
 Official website both for the short film The Portal and the spun-off webseries Riftworld Chronicles
 Official Riftworld Chronicles playlist on the YouTube channel of CBC Punchline
 Punchline Originals: Riftworld Chronicles on CBC.ca

2014 films
2010s science fiction films
Films about magic
2014 short films
Canadian science fiction short films
Canadian comedy short films
2010s English-language films
2010s Canadian films